Joseph and Potiphar's Wife is a painting by Orazio Gentileschi, painted around 1630-1632 during his time in Charles I's court. Along with The Finding of Moses (National Gallery) and an Apollo and the Muses (Private Collection), it was created for Queen Henrietta to hang in the Queen's House in Greenwich.

Gentileschi received his last payment for the work from the royal family in July 1632 and a frame was made ready for it at Greenwich between 1633 and 1634. It remains in the Royal Collection.

The theme relates to the story told in Book of Genesis chapter 39, of Joseph in Potiphar's house.

References

Bibliography
 

Paintings in the Royal Collection of the United Kingdom
1632 paintings
Paintings by Orazio Gentileschi
Gentileschi, Orazio
Henrietta Maria